Chariesthes rutila is a species of beetle in the family Cerambycidae. It was described by Karl Jordan in 1894. It is known from Gabon and Equatorial Guinea.

References

Chariesthes
Beetles described in 1894